Final Boss (known earlier as Shoot to Kill and Team 3D) was a professional esports team that competed in Halo competitions sponsored by Major League Gaming (MLG) and other tournaments. With its most successful lineups consisting of a core of Dan "Ogre 1" Ryan, Tom "Ogre 2" Ryan and Dave "Walshy" Walsh, Final Boss is regarded as one of the best Halo teams of all time due to their numerous tournament victories and MLG National Championships from 2004 to 2010. They also hold the record for the longest consecutive event winning streak, with 8 straight tournament victories from 2005 into 2006.

Former team members include Dave "Walshy" Walsh, Tom "OGRE 2" Ryan, Dan "OGRE 1" Ryan, Ryan "Saiyan" Danford, Michael "StrongSide" Cavanaugh and Justin "iGotUrPistola" Deese. NBA player Gilbert Arenas was once a sponsor of the team.

Final Boss was one of the professional teams that competed on the Boost Mobile Major League Gaming Pro Circuit that aired on USA Network in 2006. After several years of competing in Halo 3 and later Halo: Reach, Final Boss disbanded in 2011. In 2014, Ogre 2 revived the Shoot to Kill name for his Halo 2: Anniversary team, but the name was short-lived as the team was soon acquired by esports organization Counter Logic Gaming.

Ogre 2 has also fielded Final Boss teams in Call of Duty and Shadowrun MLG tournaments.

History

Halo 2 
The original lineup of Final Boss was first formed as Shoot to Kill (StK) in 2005, at the beginning of the inaugural MLG Halo 2 season. With a roster of the Ogre twins Dan and Tom Ryan alongside Dave "Walshy" Walsh and Ryan "Saiyan" Danford, StK came in first at the five events it attended. The team then became sponsored by esports organization Team 3D and changed its name to Team 3D to reflect this. After their rebranding the team won five of the next six events.

In April 2006, Team 3D parted ways with the players and for the first time, the team took the name of Final Boss. They continued their four event winning streak into 2006, making it eight in a row before being dethroned by Carbon. The eight event streak stands as the longest winning streak in MLG history. Carbon defeated Final Boss in three straight events to close out the season, marking the first year the Ogre twins and Walshy had not won the MLG National Championship.

Final Boss made a team change for the 2007 season, dropping founding member Saiyan for Michael "StrongSide" Cavanaugh. The change proved to be fruitful, as Final Boss went on to win five of the seven tournaments in 2007, including the National Championships, to close out Halo 2 as the undisputed kings.

Halo 3 
Final Boss started Halo 3 out on a good note, winning the inaugural event of the 2008 season, but things went downhill from there. After finishing 7th and 5th in back to back events, the Ogres made the controversial decision to drop Walshy and pick up Mason "Neighbor" Cobb. After this move they improved, going on to place third in both Toronto and Dallas before finishing 4th at the National Championships.

2009 brought massive changes. Ogre 1 left the team, leaving Ogre 2 as the only remaining member of the original line up. The other team members were Justin "Fearitself" Kats, Joseph "Mackeo" Reinhart, and Cameron "Victory X" Thorlakson. This team would finish 5th in Meadowlands and 3rd in Columbus before Mackeo would be replaced by a returning StrongSide. This lineup finished 5th in Dallas. FearitSelf left the team and they picked up Dmitriy "Soviet" Gulyan, and went on to a 9th-place finish in Anaheim. They finished the year with Patrick "Sypher" Hynes in place of Soviet and an 8th-place finish at the Orlando National Championships.

To kick 2010 off, FearitSelf would rejoin Ogre 2 and Victory X, now accompanied by Anthony "Totz" Pennacchio, for a 3rd-place finish in Orlando. Following this, Totz was replaced with Halo 3 phenom Justin "iGotUrPistola" Deese, formerly of Triggers Down, leading to a 2nd-place finish in Columbus. The acquisition of Pistola would be the catalyst for a return to dominance for Final Boss, as the lineup went on to win the final 3 events of the year.

Halo: Reach 
Despite keeping the same roster from the championship 2010 Halo 3 season, Final Boss only came in 10th place playing Halo: Reach at Dallas 2011, their lowest Final Boss had placed since its inception. CompLexity Gaming sponsored the team in 2011. Disappointed as their lack of success, two players departed, Pistola and Ogre 2, the last founding member. In their place came the return of Totz and newcomer Tyler "Ninja" Blevins. The new squad finished 5th in Columbus. The team then parted ways with Ninja and brought in Scottie "Cloud" Holste. This lineup finished 8th in Anaheim and again changed with Cloud and Totz, being replaced by Jordan "Amish Acorns" Dotzel and Jacob "Hysteria" Reiser. This team went on to place 10th in Raleigh. When Amish Acorns was swapped with Brian "Legit" Rizzo the team maintained the lineup for two events getting 10th in Orlando and 6th at the Providence National Championships.

2014 temporary revival 
In 2014 Ogre 2, Heinz, SnakeBite, and Royal2 created a team under the name Shoot to Kill. They placed third at their first tournament, the Master Chief Collection Launch Invitational on November 9. In November 2014 the team signed with Counter Logic Gaming, starting that organization's Halo division.

Tournament placings 

4v4 and 3v3 tournament placings, not including free-for-all (FFA) results of team members.

2003

2004

2005

2006

2007

2008

References 

Esports teams based in the United States
Organizations established in 2005
Organizations disestablished in 2011
Halo (franchise) teams